Kanive is a small village  which is located  north of Kushalanagar in Kodagu district of Karnataka state, India. Kanive also sits on the bank of Kaveri river. Business tycoon Dodmane Deepak hails from this village.

Location
Kanive village is located near Kudige on the road from Kushal Nagar to Hassan.

Tourist attractions
Kanive village is located on the bank of River Cauvery. The famous Rama Lingeshwara temple is located here. There is a hanging bridge from the temple to the next village.

See also
Saligrama, Mysore
Konanur, Hassan
 Ramanathapura, Hassan
 Kushalanagar
 Mangalore

References 

Villages in Kodagu district